The 2010–11 Cupa României was the seventy-third season of the annual Romanian football knockout tournament. It began on 17 July 2010 with the matches of the first round. For the third consecutive season, CFR Cluj were the defending champions. However, CFR were eliminated in the quarter-finals by Gloria Bistriţa, and the cup was won by FCSB for the first time after 12 years.

The winners of the competition qualified for the play-off round of the 2011–12 UEFA Europa League.

Round of 32 
The 14 winners of the fifth phase entered in this round and were joined by the 18 teams from 2010–11 Liga I.

A more complex seeding process was employed for this round. The 32 teams were divided in three pots: A, B and C. Pot A contained the first 6 teams from the previous season of Liga I. Pot B contained the remaining 12 teams from Liga I, and pot C was filled with the 14 clubs from lower leagues. 6 teams from pot C were paired with teams from pot A, with the remaining 8 being drawn against clubs from pot B. Lastly, the four remaining teams from pot B were mated between them.

Round of 16

Quarter-finals

Semi-finals 

|}

First leg

Second leg

Final

References

External links 
 Official site
 The Romanian Cup on the FRF's official site

2010–11 in Romanian football
2010–11 domestic association football cups
2010-11